The Western Shield spiny-tailed gecko (Strophurus wellingtonae), also known commonly as Wellington's spiny-tailed gecko, is a species of lizard in the family Diplodactylidae. The species is endemic to Australia.

Etymology
The specific name, wellingtonae (genitive, feminine, singular), is in honor of Betty D. Wellington of Mount Helena, Western Australia.

Geographic range
S. wellingtonae is found in western Western Australia.

Habitat
The preferred habitats of S. wellingtonae are grassland and savanna.

Description

Reproduction
S. wellingtonae is oviparous.

References

Further reading
Cogger HG (2014). Reptiles and Amphibians of Australia, Seventh Edition. Clayton, Victoria, Australia: CSIRO Publishing. xxx + 1,033 pp. .
Greer AE (1989). The Biology and Evolution of Australian Lizards. Chipping Norton, New South Wales: Surrey Beatty & Sons. 264 pp. . (Strophurus wellingtonae, new combination).
Laube A. Langner C (2007). "Die Gattung Strophurus". Draco 8 (29): 49–66. (in German).
Rösler H (2000). "Kommentierte Liste der rezent, subrezent und fossil bekannten Geckotaxa (Reptilia: Gekkonomorpha)". Gekkota 2: 28–153. (Strophurus wellingtonae, p. 115). (in German).
Storr GM (1988). "The Diplodactylus ciliaris complex (Lacertilia: Gekkonidae) in Western Australia". Records of the Western Australian Museum 14 (1): 121–133. (Diplodactylus wellingtonae, new species, pp. 126–128 + Figures 1, 3).
Wilson, Steve; Swan, Gerry (2013). A Complete Guide to Reptiles of Australia, Fourth Edition. Sydney: New Holland Publishers. 522 pp. .

Strophurus
Geckos of Australia
Reptiles described in 1988
Taxa named by Glen Milton Storr